Dzintars Krišjānis (4 June 1958 – 16 March 2014) was a Latvian former rower who competed for the Soviet Union in the 1980 Summer Olympics. He was born in Riga and was the older brother of Dimants Krišjānis. In 1980 he was a crew member of the Soviet boat which won the silver medal in the coxed fours event.

References
Dzintars Krišjānis' profile at Sports Reference.com
Dzintars Krišjānis' obituary 

1958 births
2014 deaths
Latvian male rowers
Russian male rowers
Soviet male rowers
Olympic rowers of the Soviet Union
Rowers at the 1980 Summer Olympics
Olympic silver medalists for the Soviet Union
Sportspeople from Riga
Olympic medalists in rowing
Medalists at the 1980 Summer Olympics
World Rowing Championships medalists for the Soviet Union